Vatutine is a city in Zvenyhorodka Raion, Cherkasy Oblast (region) of Ukraine. It hosts the administration of Vatutine urban hromada, one of the hromadas of Ukraine. It had a population of

Administrative status
Vatutine gained status as a city in 1952. Until 18 July, 2020, Vatutine was designated as a city of oblast significance and belonged to Vatutine Municipality but not to any raion. As part of the administrative reform of Ukraine, which reduced the number of raions of Cherkasy Oblast to four, the city was merged into Zvenyhorodka Raion.

History 

The city was founded in 1946.

Demographics 
In January 1989, the population of the city was 20, 362 people. In January 2013, the population of the city was 17, 653 people.

See also 

 List of cities in Ukraine

References

Cities in Cherkasy Oblast
Populated places established in the Ukrainian Soviet Socialist Republic
Cities of regional significance in Ukraine